The 1972–73 season was Cambridge United's 3rd season in the Football League.

Cambridge had a fine season finishing in 3rd position and thus gaining promotion to the Third Division after only three seasons in the Football League.

Final league table

Results

Legend

Football League Fourth Division

FA Cup

League Cup

Squad statistics

References
 Cambridge 1972–73 at statto.com 
 Player information sourced from The English National Football Archive

Cambridge United F.C. seasons
Cambridge United